Felix Bloxsom is an Australian musician and songwriter, known professionally as Plastic Plates. Bloxsom is best known for his drumming and for playing the percussion, additionally working as a DJ and record producer.

Since completing Jazz studies at the Sydney Conservatorium of Music, Bloxsom has performed live and in the recording studio with a diverse group of artists across many styles and genres. These artists include MIKA, Sia, Daniel Merriweather, Empire of the Sun, Christina Aguilera, Kelly Clarkson, Jennifer Lopez, Edward Sharpe and the Magnetic Zeros, Paloma Faith, The Sleepy Jackson, Jamie Lidell, Kristina Train, The Presets, Leona Naess, Elliott Yamin, Sneaky Sound System, Will Young, Missy Higgins. Felix lives in New York City.

Felix was awarded 'Young Australian Jazz Artist of the Year' on 25 August at the 2004 Australian Jazz Bell Awards and 1st place in the National Jazz Awards at the 2004 Wangaratta Festival of Jazz.

Connection to Sam Sparro

Bloxsom went to the same primary school in Sydney as Sam Sparro. Sparro has stated that the two were close friends. While the two were growing up, Felix's father and Sam's grandfather played in local jazz bands together. Bloxsom is credited as having played drums for every song that features the instrument on Sparro's second album Return to Paradise, as well as remixing the song "Shades of Grey" for the album's re-release. On February 14, 2014 the two collaborated again on Plastic Plates' single "Stay in Love".

Discography

Singles
 Things I Didn't Know I Loved 
 More Than Love
 Toys
 Come On Strong
 Stay In Love

Remixes
 Midnight Juggernauts - Lara Vs The Savage Pack
 Empire of The Sun - Girl 
 Sia - Cloud
 I Blame Coco - Turn Your Back On Love
 Body Language - Social Studies
 Gypsy and the Cat - Jona Vark
 Adele - Set Fire To The Rain
 Indian Summer - Loveweights ft Shaqdi
 The Human League - Sky
 Mark Ronson - Record Collection 2012
 Para One - Every Little Thing 
 Strange Talk - Cast Away
 Katy Perry - The One That Got Away
 The Magician - I Don't Know What To Do 
 Sam Sparro - Shades of Grey
 Van She - Jamaica
 All The Nights - Chasing Colours
 Sneaky Sound System - Friends
 The Presets - Promises
 The Wombats - Our Perfect Disease
 The Aston Shuffle - Can't Stop Now
 Nile Delta - Aztec
 Miami Horror - Real Slow
 Munk - Intimate Stranger
 Yolanda Be Cool - All That She Wants 
 Sia - Chandelier
 Sia - Alive

References

Australian jazz drummers
Male drummers
Living people
Year of birth missing (living people)
Sydney Conservatorium of Music alumni
Australian indie pop musicians
Australian indie rock musicians
Kitsuné artists
Male jazz musicians